Henan Experimental Primary School (Chinese: 河南省实验小学; Pinyin: Hénán Shěn Shíyàn Xiǎoxué), founded in 1960, is a primary school in Jinshui District, Zhengzhou, Henan, China.

It was selected as one of the ten Olympics Education Model Schools in Henan in 2007.

References

External links
Official website of Henan Experimental Primary School

Education in Zhengzhou
Education in Henan
Educational institutions established in 1960
Public primary schools in China
Experimental schools
1960 establishments in China